Rubber Jungle Records is an independent record label created by Phish frontman Trey Anastasio. It was started by Anastasio to release his album One Man's Trash. The label released Anastasio's The Horseshoe Curve on July 24, 2007, and the live album Original Boardwalk Style on June 10, 2008.

See also
 List of record labels

References

Record labels established in 1998
American independent record labels
Rock record labels
Vanity record labels
Companies based in Burlington, Vermont